Germaine Cernay, born Germaine Pointu (28 April 1900, Le Havre – 19 September 1943, Paris) was a French mezzo-soprano who was active both in the opera house and on the concert platform.

Life and career
Cernay studied the piano before entering the Conservatoire de Paris for vocal studies under Albers and Engel, winning first prizes in 1925.

She made her debut at the Opéra-Comique in Paris on 16 May 1927 as la Bossue in the Paris premiere of Alfano's Risurrezione (in French). Other creations at the Salle Favart were Floriane in Éros Vainqueur (de Bréville), la Tour in Le Fou de la Dame (Delannoy), a fairy in Riquet a la Houppe (Hue), and Léonor in Le Sicilien (Letorey). Her other principal roles at the Opéra-Comique included Sélysette (Ariane et Barbe-bleue), a sister (Béatrice), Gertrude (Le roi Dagobert), la fantôme (Les Contes d'Hoffmann), Mallika (Lakmé), Javotte (Manon), title role in Mignon, Souzouki (Madame Butterfly), Vincenette/Taven (Mireille), Geneviève (Pelléas et Mélisande), Cléone (Pénélope), Charlotte (Werther) and one of the voices in Masques et bergamasques.

She was invited to many provincial centres in France and also appeared in North Africa, Switzerland, Belgium, England, Ireland and Italy.

Broadcasting on French radio allowed Cernay to enlarge her repertoire to roles in Carmen, Le roi d’Ys, Le Chemineau, La damnation de Faust, Don Quichotte and La Lépreuse. She also sang in the first performance of surviving fragments of Chabrier's Vaucochard et fils Ier on 22 April 1941 at the Salle du Conservatoire.

Cernay was one of the best-known concert altos of her generation and highly considered as a Bach interpreter.

She appeared regularly with the Orchestre de la Societe des Concerts du Conservatoire from 1931 to 1942. Her first and last appearances with the orchestra were as alto soloist in the Bach Magnificat, and in 1936 she sang in two performances of the Mass in B minor. Other works in which she sang at the concerts included Trois Duos by Raymond Loucheur, an excerpt from Couronnement de Poppée, Trois Poèmes by Philippe Gaubert, the Duo from Béatrice et Bénédict, Duos by Dandelot (premiere), Szymanowski's Stabat mater, excerpts from Prométhée, Le Martyre de Saint Sébastien, Jeanne d’Arc (oratorio in seven parts by Louis Beydts, George Dandelot, Loucheur, Tony Aubin, Jacques Chailley, Pierre Capdevielle, and André Jolivet), and the Mozart Requiem. She retired in 1942 to become a nun. A year later she died of status epilepticus.

Discography
Cernay's many recordings, made from February 1928 to June 1942, for Odéon and Columbia include:
 JS Bach: Christmas Oratorio – Sion tiens-toi prête; Cantata for the 14th Sunday after Trinity	
 Berlioz: L'Absence; La damnation de Faust: Il était un roi de Thulé, D'amour, l'ardente flamme
 Bizet: Carmen: Excerpts – L'amour est enfant de bohême, Quintet, Seguidilla, Les tringles des sistres tintaient, Melons! Coupons!; Complete (from radio broadcast, title role)
 Borodin: Prince Igor: Lentement baisse le jour, Sur la terre lasse
 Brahms: Deux cantiques op. 91 n °1 et 2
 Charpentier: Louise: L'enfant serait sage, Ah! N'est ce plus mon enfant, O jolie, Il va venir bientôt, O mon enfant, o ma Louise
 Dandelot: Chanson de Bilitis
 Debussy: Pelléas et Mélisande (Geneviève); L’Enfant prodigue – Recit et air d'Azael	
 Délibes: Lakmé – Sous le dôme épais (with Solange Delmas, soprano)
 Duparc: La manoir de Rosemonde (with Gustave Cloëz, piano)
 Fauré: En Prière, Un parfum impérissable, Pleurs d'or, op. 72, Tarentelle, op. 10, no. 2, Salve Regina; Pénélope – C'est sur ce banc, Je l'attends, Minerve le protégé; Cantique de Jean Racine
 Ganne: Les saltimbanques – C'est l'amour
 Godard: Jocelyn – Berceuse
 Gounod: Faust – Faites-lui mes aveux; Mireille – Vincenette, votre âge
 Grieg: Peer Gynt, op. 23 – Solvejgs sang
 Hue: Nous deux (with Gustave Cloëz, piano)
 Lalo: Le roi d'Ys: Air de Margared, Margared, o ma sœur (with Bernadette Delprat, soprano)
 Lecocq: La fille de Madame Angot: Voyons, monsieur, raisonnons politique; Des lettres (with Victor Pujol, tenor)
 Lehar: Lustige Witwe – Chanson de Vylja, Je ne connais votre Jeanette, Heure exquise, Final du 1er acte, C'est la valse
 Mascagni: Cavalleria rusticana (Santuzza; with Gaston Micheletti, tenor, Arthur Endrèze, baritone, Alice Hena, soprano, Mady Arty, contralto)
 Massenet: Sapho: Air le la Lampe ; Werther: (Charlotte, highlights) Prière, Air des lettres, Oui, c'est moi (with Charles Friant, tenor), Albert est de retour, Mort de Werther, Air je dit vrai, Va, ma laisse couler mes larmes, Ah! Ce premier baiser ; Hérodiade: Ne me refuse pas ; Thérèse: Le devoir, Jour de juin, tour d'été, Oui je t'aime André, je te vénère ; Don Quichotte – J'ai bien assez de mon tristesse, Oui je souffre, votre tristesse, Marchez dans mon chemin, Quand apparaissent les étoiles (with Roger Bourdin, baritone) ; Le Cid: Pleurez, pleurez mes yeux
 Mozart: Le nozze di Figaro – Ouvre, ouvre bien vite (with Emma Luart, soprano)
 Offenbach: Les contes d'Hoffmann: Barcarolle (with Emma Luart, soprano)
 Planquette: Rip: Si je la veux immense richesse
 Puccini: Madama Butterfly: Sur ma joue, la brise, Jetons comme à brassees (with Emma Luart, soprano)
 Rachmaninoff: Lilacs / Rose and the nightingale (with Gustave Cloëz, piano)
 Ravel : L'enfant et les sortilèges, excerpts
 Renauld : Pater noster – Ave maria
 Saint-Saëns : Samson et Dalila – Printemps qui commence, Samson toi mon bien, Se pourrait-il ? (with Georges Thill, tenor); La cloche
 Schutz : Exauce-moi (with Martha Angelici, soprano)
 Thomas : Mignon: Connais-tu le pays?, Elle est là, Près de lui, Romance de Mignon, As-tu souffert, as-tu pleuré?, Prière et Final O Vierge Marie, Melodrama et Duo Je suis heureuse, Duo des hirondelles, Styrienne, Légères hirondelles
 Wagner : Rêves

References

French operatic mezzo-sopranos
1900 births
1943 deaths
Musicians from Le Havre
Conservatoire de Paris alumni
20th-century French women opera singers
Neurological disease deaths in France
Deaths from epilepsy